FC M.C. Tallinn is a defunct Estonian football club.

References

External links
FC M.C. Tallinn Estonian Football Association

Football clubs in Tallinn
1995 establishments in Estonia
Association football clubs established in 1995
2014 establishments in Estonia
Association football clubs disestablished in 2014